Atelestus may refer to:
 Atelestus (fly), a genus of flies in the family Atelestidae
 Atelestus, a genus of beetles in the family Malachiidae; synonym of Brachemys